Rudolf "Rudi" Bommer (born 19 August 1957) is a German former footballer, who played as a midfielder, and current football manager.

Playing career

Born in Aschaffenburg, Bommer played 417 games between 1976 and 1996 for Fortuna Düsseldorf, Bayer Uerdingen and Eintracht Frankfurt in the Bundesliga. Bommer scored 54 goals in the German top flight.

He played for West Germany at the Euro 84 in France.

Coaching career
Bommer started his coaching career with the reserve team of Eintracht Frankfurt between July 1994 and August 1995. After stops at VfR Mannheim where he was head coach between July 1997 and April 1998. Bommer then moved on to Viktoria Aschaffenburg where he was head coach from July 1998 to June 2000. Bommer became head coach Wacker Burghausen in October 2000 and won his debut 4–3 against his former club VfR Mannheim. Bommer left and became head coach of 1860 München in July 2004. His tenure ended in December 2004; winning five of his 15 league matches in charge. Bommer's next job was as head coach of 1. FC Saarbrücken. He was there between August 2005 and May 2006. Bommer then went to MSV Duisburg between July 2006 and November 2008; finishing with a league record of 28 wins, 21 draws, and 31 losses. Bommer returned to Wacker Burghausen in July 2011 and was there until December 2011. He then joined Energie Cottbus the next month and was there until November 2013.

In October 2015 he became the new coach of Regionalliga Bayern club Viktoria Aschaffenburg, replacing the sacked Slobodan Komljenović.

Coaching record

References

External links
 Rudi Bommer at eintracht-archiv.de 
 
 
 Rudi Bommer at Footballdatabase

1957 births
Living people
People from Aschaffenburg
Sportspeople from Lower Franconia
German footballers
Germany international footballers
Germany B international footballers
Fortuna Düsseldorf players
Eintracht Frankfurt players
Eintracht Frankfurt managers
TSV 1860 Munich managers
1. FC Saarbrücken managers
Olympic footballers of West Germany
West German footballers
Footballers at the 1984 Summer Olympics
Footballers at the 1988 Summer Olympics
Olympic bronze medalists for West Germany
UEFA Euro 1984 players
KFC Uerdingen 05 players
Bundesliga players
2. Bundesliga players
MSV Duisburg managers
Viktoria Aschaffenburg players
VfR Mannheim managers
Olympic medalists in football
SV Wacker Burghausen managers
2. Bundesliga managers
Footballers from Bavaria
Medalists at the 1988 Summer Olympics
Association football midfielders
German football managers
3. Liga managers